Kovilpatti Veeralakshmi is a 2003 Indian Tamil language film directed by K. Rajeshwar. Simran dubbed in her own voice for the first time in this film with some dialogues dubbed by Deepa Venkat. The film was the last to have music composed by Aadithyan, who went on to host a show on Jaya TV.

Plot
The film is about a woman who is battling against untouchability in a village. Veeralakshmi (Simran) and her fellow Dalits undergo unbearable torture due to casteism from a brutal police force. In their village, the inspector of police is the feudal lord, who beats up the poor men and rapes the women, with his behaviour emulated by his officers. Pushed to the limits by the extent of her subjugation, Veeralakshmi rises in revolt.

Cast 
 Simran as Veeralakshmi
 Sherin as Seetha
 Sonu Sood as Rajiv Mathur
 Alex
 Akshaya Rao
 Gowthami Vembunathan as Veeralakshmi's mother
 Indhu

Production 
The film was initially planned to be started in 1996 with Shweta Menon in the lead role, but was delayed. The project was launched in early 2000 with Shweta, but was discontinued. Simran was subsequently cast to play the lead role.

Soundtrack
The soundtrack was composed by Adithyan, while lyrics written by K. Rajeshwar.
 "Dheem Tharikida" - Sirkazhi Sivachidambaram
 "Eleloa Elelo" - Harini
 "Kakka Mugathazhaga" - Swarnalatha, Solar Sai
 "Ola Kudisaiyiley" - Mano, Harini
 "Oyilakka Kondaiyeley" - Pushpavanam Kuppusamy

Reviews
The Hindu wrote that "a thread of sincerity runs through the entire film that makes different from the action flicks one is used to".

References

2003 films
Films about the caste system in India
2000s Tamil-language films
Indian feminist films
Films about women in India
Films about rape in India
Indian films based on actual events
Films directed by K. Rajeshwar